Tatem may refer to:
 Tatem Elementary School, Collingswood, NJ
 Tatem Island, Bermuda
 For people surnamed Tatem, see Tatem (surname)
 Tatem, cloud-based task management and collaboration software